The 1843 Whanganui earthquake occurred on 8 July at 16:45 local time with an estimated magnitude of 7.5 on the  scale. The maximum perceived intensity was IX (Violent) on the Mercalli intensity scale, and possibly reaching X (Extreme). The epicentre is estimated to have been within a zone extending 50 km northeast from Whanganui towards Taihape. GNS Science has this earthquake catalogued and places the epicentre 35 km east of Taihape, near the border of Hawke's Bay. This was the first earthquake in New Zealand over magnitude 7 for which written records exist, and the first for which deaths were recorded.

Tectonic setting
New Zealand lies along the boundary between the Australian and Pacific Plates. In South Island most of the relative displacement between these plates is taken up along a single dextral (right lateral) strike-slip fault with a major reverse component, the Alpine Fault. In North Island the displacement is mainly taken up along the Kermadec subduction zone, although the remaining dextral strike-slip component of the relative plate motion is accommodated by the North Island Fault System (NIFS). A group of dextral strike-slip structures, known as the Marlborough Fault System, transfer displacement between the mainly transform and convergent type plate boundaries in a complex zone at the northern end of South Island. The presumed epicentre of the 1843 earthquake is not, however, associated with any known fault.

Earthquake characteristics
The shock was felt over much of North Island and was reported as lasting for three minutes near Mokoia. A magnitude of 7.5 was estimated from the extent of the area that was subject to a shaking level of at least VIII (Severe). At least ten aftershocks were reported on the same day as the mainshock and further shocks were reported until January 1845.

Damage
Damage in the Whanganui area reached IX–X on the Mercalli intensity scale. Many houses were damaged, and a brick church at Putiki was destroyed. There was extensive lateral spreading of the terrace margin to the Whanganui River, and a section of Shakespeare Cliff fell into the river. Two people were killed when their house was swept away by one of the landslides caused by the earthquake.

See also
 1848 Marlborough earthquake
 List of earthquakes in New Zealand
 List of historical earthquakes

References

Earthquakes in New Zealand
History of Manawatū-Whanganui
Wanganui
1843 in New Zealand
July 1843 events
1843 disasters in New Zealand